Pseudocorythalia is a monotypic genus of Guatemalan jumping spiders containing the single species, Pseudocorythalia subinermis. It was first described by Lodovico di Caporiacco in 1938, and is found only in Guatemala. The name is a combination of the Ancient Greek "pseudo-", meaning "false", and the salticid genus name Corythalia.

References

Endemic fauna of Guatemala
Monotypic Salticidae genera
Salticidae
Spiders of Central America